The 1922 UCI Track Cycling World Championships were the World Championship for track cycling. The qualifications took place in Liverpool, United Kingdom and the finals in Paris, France from 19 July to 17 September 1922. Three events for men were contested, two for professionals and one for amateurs.

Medal summary

Medal table

See also
 1922 UCI Road World Championships

References

Track cycling
Track cycling
UCI Track Cycling World Championships by year
International cycle races hosted by France
International cycle races hosted by England
Uc
International sports competitions in Liverpool
1922 in track cycling
1920s in Liverpool
UCI Track Cycling World Championships